Cynthia Lynn Wood (born September 25, 1950) is an American model and actress. She was born in Burbank, California. She was chosen as Playboy magazine's Playmate of the Month in February 1973, and the 1974 Playmate of the Year. Her centerfold was photographed by Pompeo Posar.
In 1983, she recorded vocals for three songs on the soundtrack for the anime film Golgo 13: The Professional, credited as Cindy Wood, with lyrics written by Toshiyuki Kimori. She has worked as a casting agent and also has a PhD in psychology.

Partial filmography 
Shampoo (1975) .... Beauty Shop Customer
Strange New World (1975) (TV) .... Araba
Three on a Date (1978) (TV) .... Stewardess
Van Nuys Boulevard (1979) .... Moon
Apocalypse Now (1979) .... Playmate of the Year (final film role)

Notable TV guest appearances 
The Jim Stafford Show (1975) TV Series .... herself
The Sonny & Cher Comedy Hour playing herself (season three, episode 19) February 10, 1973

Discography

See also
 List of people in Playboy 1970–79

References

External links 

1950 births
American film actresses
Living people
People from Burbank, California
1970s Playboy Playmates
Playboy Playmates of the Year
Los Angeles City College alumni
21st-century American women